Erode division is one of the two revenue divisions in Erode district of Tamil Nadu, India. The revenue division includes 4 taluks.

They four taluks are 
 Erode taluk
 Perundurai taluk
 Modakurichi taluk
 Kodumudi taluk

The population of Erode division is 11,34,765 with an area of 2,145sqkm.

References 
 

Erode district